Don Metz may refer to:

 Don Metz (architect) (born 1940), American architect
 Don Metz (ice hockey) (1916–2007), ice hockey right winger
 Donald J. Metz (1924–1999), nuclear engineer